The oxytocin receptor, also known as OXTR, is a protein which functions as receptor for the hormone and neurotransmitter oxytocin. In humans, the oxytocin receptor is encoded by the OXTR gene which has been localized to human chromosome 3p25.

Function and location

The OXTR protein belongs to the G-protein coupled receptor family, specifically Gq, and acts as a receptor for oxytocin. Its activity is mediated by G proteins that activate several different second messenger systems.

Oxytocin receptors are expressed by the myoepithelial cells of the mammary gland, and in both the myometrium and endometrium of the uterus at the end of pregnancy.
The oxytocin-oxytocin receptor system plays an important role as an inducer of uterine contractions during parturition and of milk ejection.

OXTR is also associated with the central nervous system. The gene is believed to play a major role in social, cognitive, and emotional behavior.  A decrease in OXTR expression by methylation of the OXTR gene is associated with  Callous and unemotional traits in adolescence, rigid thinking in anorexia nervosa, problems with facial and emotional recognition, and difficulties in the  affect regulation. A reduction in this gene is believed to lead to prenatal stress, postnatal depression, and social anxiety. Further research must be gathered before concluding these findings, however strong evidence is pointing in this direction. Studies on OXTR methylation—which downregulates oxytocin mechanisms—suggest this process is associated with increased gray matter density in the amygdala, implicating OXTR regulation in stress and parasympathetic regulation.

In some mammals, oxytocin receptors are also found in the kidney and heart.

Mesolimbic dopamine pathways
The oxytocinergic circuit projecting from the paraventricular hypothalamic nucleus (PVN) innervates the ventral tegmental area (VTA) dopaminergic neurons that project to the nucleus accumbens, i.e., the mesolimbic pathway.  Activation of the PVN→VTA projection by oxytocin affects sexual, social, and addictive behavior via this link to the mesolimbic pathway; specifically, oxytocin exerts a prosexual and prosocial effect in this region.

Polymorphism 

The receptors for oxytocin (OXTR) have genetic differences with varied effects on individual behavior.  The polymorphism (rs53576) occurs on the third intron of OXTR in three types: GG, AG, AA. The GG allele is connected with oxytocin levels in people . A-allele carrier individuals are associated with more sensitivity to stress, fewer social skills, and more mental health issues than the GG-carriers. 

In a study looking at empathy and stress, individuals with the allele GG scored higher than A-carrier individuals in a "Reading the Mind in the Eyes" test.  GG carriers, with their naturally higher levels of oxytocin , were better able to distinguish between emotions.  A-allele carriers responded with more stress to stressful situations than GG-allele carriers. A-allele carriers had lower scores on psychological resources, like optimism, mastery, and self-esteem, than GG individuals when measured with factor analysis for depressive symptomology and psychological resources, along with the Beck Depression Inventory. A-allele carriers had higher depressive symptomology and lower psychological resources than GG individuals. A-allele individuals scored lower in human sociality than GG people on a Tridimensional Personality Questionnaire.  AA individuals had the lowest amygdala activation while processing emotionally salient information and those with GG had the highest activity when tested using BOLD during an fMRI. On the other hand, variations at the CD38 rs3796863 and OXTR rs53576 loci were not associated with psychosocial characteristics of adolescents assessed with the Strengths and Difficulties Questionnaire (SDQ); in studies with a similar design, authors recommend replication with larger samples and greater power to detect small effects, especially in age–sex subgroups of adolescents.

The frequency of the A allele varies among ethnic groups, being significantly more common among East Asians than Europeans.

Some evidence suggests an association between OXTR gene polymorphism and Autism Spectrum Disorder (ASD). Studies have done research focusing on variants in the third intron of the gene, a region that is strongly correlated with personality traits and ASD. OXTR knockout mice have shown abnormal behaviors such as social impairments and aggressiveness. These abnormalities can be reduced with oxytocin or oxytocin agonist administration. Overall, the study suggests that rare variants are considerably more abundant in individuals with ASD compared to that of a normal individual, however further research with larger sample sizes must be completed before concluding any information.

Ligands 

Several selective ligands for the oxytocin receptor have recently been developed, but close similarity between the oxytocin and related vasopressin receptors make it difficult to achieve high selectivity with peptide derivatives. However the search for a druggable, non-peptide template has led to several potent, highly selective, orally bioavailable oxytocin antagonists.

Agonists 

Peptide
 Carbetocin
 Demoxytocin
 Lipo-oxytocin-1
 Merotocin
 Oxytocin

Non-peptide
 TC OT 39 – non-selective over vasopressin receptors
 WAY-267,464 – anxiolytic in mice; possibly non-selective over vasopressin receptors

Antagonists 

Peptide
 Atosiban
 Barusiban

Non-peptide
 Epelsiban
 L-368,899 (CAS# 148927-60-0)
 L-371,257 (CAS# 162042-44-6) – peripherally selective (i.e. poor blood brain barrier penetration, few central effects)
 L-372,662
 Retosiban (GSK-221,149)
 SSR-126,768
 WAY-162,720 – centrally active following peripheral administration

References

External links

G protein-coupled receptors
Genes on human chromosome 3